General Adair may refer to:

Allan Adair (1897–1988), British Army major general
Charles Adair (Royal Marines officer) (1822–1897), Royal Marines general
William Adair (1850–1931), Royal Marines general